Hieraniony is a village (an agrotown) in Iwye District, Belarus. It is located near the Belarus–Lithuania border. It is known for the 16th-century Hieraniony Castle built by Albertas Goštautas. The village's population was 306 residents in 1792, 316 in 1905, 397 in 1970, and 1,278 in 2010.

References

Agrotowns in Belarus
Populated places in Grodno Region
Iwye District